Vetulocystis is an extinct genus of vetulocystids. It was found in remains of Shankou, in Anning (Cambrian of China). Approximately 541 Ma.

Phylogeny

See also

Vetulicola

References

Vetulocystidae
Cambrian genus extinctions